Pyrrhic Victory is an EP by metalcore band Zao, released on November 3, 2017. It is the third release by the band on their own Observed/Observer Recordings label since their reactivation in 2015 after several years of hiatus. The songs were recorded during the same sessions that resulted in 2015's Xenophobe and 2016's The Well-Intentioned Virus. The EP in its entirety was streamed on the Metal Injection website on October 31, 2017.

Track listing

Personnel 
Zao
 Dan Weyandt – vocals
 Scott Mellinger – guitar, vocals
 Russ Cogdell – guitar
 Martin Lunn – bass
 Jeff Gretz – drums

Production
 Matt Kerley – artwork
 Dave Hidek – mixing, engineer
 Garret Haines – mastering
 Ben Buckner – art layout
 Josh Bonati – lacquers

Charts

References

External links
Bandcamp

Zao (American band) albums
2017 EPs